61st Infantry Regiment can refer to several military units:

 Infantry regiments
61st Infantry Regiment (United States) - (Second World War)
61st Infantry Regiment (Finland) - (Second World War)
61st (South Gloucestershire) Regiment of Foot - A British regiment that existed from 1758 to 1881